Bob Holt (born 18 May 1944) is a former English distance runner. His twin brother Dave Holt competed in the 10000 metres at the 1972 Summer Olympics in Munich. Of the two, Bob had a faster personal best of 28 minutes 39.8, set in September 1972, whereas Dave's personal best was 28 minutes 41.82, which he set at Crystal Palace on 15 July 1972. However, Bob did not compete at a major international championship. He originally competed for Hercules AC, and following that club's merger with Wimbledon AC, he competed for Hercules-Wimbledon AC. Bob placed third in the 10000 metres at the 1970 AAA Championships at White City Stadium, recording 28 minutes 40.28.

References

1944 births
Living people
English male long-distance runners
Athletes (track and field) at the 1972 Summer Olympics
Olympic athletes of Great Britain